Dihydroprogesterone may refer to:

 5α-Dihydroprogesterone
 5β-Dihydroprogesterone
 20α-Dihydroprogesterone (20α-hydroxyprogesterone)
 20β-Dihydroprogesterone (20β-hydroxyprogesterone)
 3α-Dihydroprogesterone
 3β-Dihydroprogesterone
 17α,21-Dihydroprogesterone (11-deoxycortisol)
 11β,21-Dihydroprogesterone (corticosterone)

See also
 Progesterone
 Pregnanedione
 Pregnanolone
 Pregnanediol
 Pregnanetriol
 Hydroxyprogesterone

Biochemistry
Pregnanes